El Alto is an eastern  department of Catamarca Province in Argentina.

External links
El Alto webpage (Spanish)

Departments of Catamarca Province